Antibalas (Spanish for "bulletproof") is an American, Brooklyn-based afrobeat band that is modeled after Fela Kuti's Africa 70 band and Eddie Palmieri's Harlem River Drive Orchestra. Although their music generally follows the musical architecture and language of afrobeat, it incorporates elements of jazz, funk, dub, improvised music, and traditional drumming from Cuba and West Africa.

History
Founded in 1998 by Martín Perna as "Conjunto Antibalas", the group first performed on May 26, 1998, at St. Nicks Pub in Harlem at a poetry night organized by renowned visual artist Xaviera Simmons. Over the course of the next few months, the group solidified with a core of eleven band members and expanded their repertoire of original songs. For the first year of the group's existence, they performed exclusively at non-commercial venues such as block parties, lofts, and public parks, before securing a Friday night residency at the now-defunct NoMoore in August 1999. Called Africalia!, the residency lasted from August 1999 till April 2001, when the club was shut down by fire officials during the Giuliani administration's crackdown on nightclubs and cabarets. Guitarist and producer/engineer Gabriel Roth wrote several of the earlier tunes and oversaw recording and production of the first three records.

Over the next few years, the band's presence grew; by summer 2000 Antibalas had released their first album Liberation Afrobeat Vol. 1 and had toured twice in England, while continuing to play at venues throughout New York City. Recording with the group in the early days was Cameroonian drummer Jojo Kuo, who can be heard on the studio recordings of "Uprising" and "Machete".

By early 2002, the horn-driven outfit had released their second album, Talkatif, and continued to tour throughout the United States and Europe. In summer 2004, their third studio album, Who is This America?, was released on Ropeadope Records. Antibalas's album, Security, was produced by John McEntire and released on the ANTI- label in 2007.

Antibalas has performed in 35 countries, including Japan and Australia, and throughout New York City, from Carnegie Hall to Central Park Summerstage to the Rikers Island prison facility.

The group has received guest visits from several musicians from Fela Kuti's Afrika 70 and Egypt 80 bands, including Tony Allen (drums), Femi Kuti (alto sax), Seun Kuti (tenor sax), Tunde Williams (trumpet), Oghene Kologbo (guitar), Nicolas Addey (congas), Dele Sosimi (keyboards), Ola Jagun (drums/percussion), and Jojo Kuo (drums) among others.

In the summer of 2008, Antibalas was featured off-Broadway in Fela!, a musical celebrating the life of Fela Kuti. The group arranged and performed the show's score of music originally performed by Kuti. In the fall of 2009, Fela! opened on Broadway at the Eugene O'Neill Theatre, once again with Antibalas.

In 2010, the band released their Rat Race EP, with an arrangement of Bob Marley's "Rat Race" featuring Amayo on vocals, as well as "Se Chifló" featuring Chico Mann as vocalist.

In 2011, the band reunited with producer and former Antibalas guitarist Gabriel Roth at Daptone Studios in Bushwick, Brooklyn, to record their fifth full-length album, entitled Antibalas. The album was released on August 7, 2012, on the Daptone label.

The band resumed a heavy touring schedule beginning in April 2012 with their debut tour in Brazil, performing in São Paulo and Recife, and kicked off a US tour at the Outsidelands Festival in San Francisco, followed by a tour of California. On August 24, 2012, Antibalas made their national television debut, performing their single "Dirty Money" on NBC's Late Night with Jimmy Fallon. On September 11, they resumed their US/Canada tour with 30 dates in the Midwest, East Coast, Southeast and Gulf Coast, including the Austin City Limits Festival. On October 4, they appeared on NPR's Tiny Desk Concerts. The band toured in Europe in October and November 2012, followed by an Australian tour in March 2013 . In May of the same year Antibalas visited Mexico for first time, performing in Puebla "Festival 5 de Mayo" with original members like Victor Axelrod.

In 2015, The Antibalas horn section collaborated with The Dap-Kings horn section, Mark Ronson, and Bruno Mars to record Uptown Funk and other tracks from Mark Ronson's 2015 album Uptown Special.  They also performed Uptown Funk together on Saturday Night Live in November 2014.

In 2020, Antibalas released their seventh full-length studio album, entitled Fu Chronicles, on the Daptone label. Amayo told NPR's Morning Edition "Since I was a kid, I was always studying martial arts and kung fu was very central [to] everything I did. So when I started playing music, I couldn't imagine not having kung fu as part of that training. But then, I wanted to now figure out a way to bring it all together. So this album was the first chapter in [which] kung fu meets Afrobeat." The band will be on a worldwide tour in support of Fu Chronicles throughout 2020. Fu Chronicles was nominated in the category of Best Global Music Album for the 63rd Annual Grammy Awards.

Band members

Current
Martin Perna – baritone saxophone (1998–present)
Jordan McLean – trumpet, flugelhorn (1999–present)
Marcos J. Garcia – guitar, vocals (2003–present)
Eric Biondo – trumpet (2003–present)
Marcus Farrar – shekere, vocals (2005–present)
Reinaldo de Jesus – congas (2010–present)
Timothy Allen - guitar (2010–present)
Will Rast – organ, electric pianos, synthesizers (2013–present)
Raymond James Mason – trombone (2013–present)
Kevin Raczka – drums (2015–present)
Raja Kassis – guitar (2015–present)
Justin Kimmel – guitar, Bass (2019–present)
Morgan Price – tenor Saxophone (2019–present)
Jackie Coleman – trumpet (2019–present)

Former
Duke Amayo – vocals, congas, percussion (1999–2021)
Luke O'Malley – guitar (1999–2018)
Victor Axelrod – organ, electric pianos, clavinet, electric celeste, synthesizers, percussion (1999–2012)
Dylan Fusillo – percussion, drums (1999–2009)
Fernando Velez – congas (1999–2006)
Phillip Ballman – drums, first band manager (1999–2006)
Gabriel Roth (aka Bosco Mann) – guitar (1999–2005)

Former
Michael Herbst – tenor saxophone, alto saxophone (1999–2003)
Mike Wagner – trombone (1999–2003)
Giancarlo Luiggi – shekere (1999–2003)
Amadou Diallo – guitar, bass  (1999–2001)
Aaron Johnson – trombone (2000–2018)
Del Stribling – bass (2000–2005)
Stuart D. Bogie – tenor saxophone, alto saxophone (2001–2018)
Ernesto Abreu – congas (2001–2003)
Todd Simon – trumpet (2001–2003)
Anda Szilagyi – trumpet (2001–2003)
Nick Movshon – bass (2003–2010)
Geoff Mann – shekere (2003–2005)
Chris Vatalaro – drums (2006–2010)
Miles Arntzen – drums (2010–2018)
Nikhil P. Yerawadekar – bass guitar, guitar (2010–2018)
Yoshi Takamasa – percussion (2010–2013)
Cochemea Gastelum – tenor saxophone, alto saxophone (2010–2013)
Dave Guy – trumpet (2010–2013)
Jeff Pierce – trombone, trumpet (2013–2018)
Jas Walton – tenor saxophone (2015–2018)
Joseph Woullard – tenor saxophone (2015–2018)
Doug Berns – bass (2015–2018)

Timeline

Discography

Albums
Liberation Afrobeat Vol. 1 (2000, Afrosound, reissued by Ninja Tune in 2001)
Talkatif (2002, Ninja Tune)
Who is This America? (2004, Ropeadope Records / Daptone)
Security (2007, ANTI-; Daptone)
Antibalas (2012, Daptone)
Where the Gods Are in Peace (2017, Daptone)
Fu Chronicles (2020, Daptone)

EPs and singles
Uprising (1999, Afrosound) 7"
N.E.S.T.A. (2000, Afrosound) 12"
Tour EP (2002, Afrosound) EP
Che Che Colé (2003, Daptone) 12"
Government Magic (2005, Afrosound) EP
K-Leg/R.O.C. (2006, Purpose) 12"
Family Affair/Mr President (2006, Mind Records and Service) Split 7" by Antibalas/Psycho
Rat Race/Se Chifló 12" (2010, Exactamundo Records)
Tattletale 7" (2014, Daptone Records)
Fight Am Finish (2019, Daptone Records)

Albums featured
Uninvisible by Medeski Martin & Wood (2002, Blue Note)
Desperate Youth, Bloodthirsty Babes by TV on the Radio (2004, Touch and Go / 4AD)
Zen of Logic by DJ Logic (2006, Ropeadope Records)
Return to Cookie Mountain by TV on the Radio (2006, 4AD/Interscope)
Antidotes by Foals (2008, Transgressive/Sub Pop)
Dear Science, by TV on the Radio (2008, 4AD/Interscope)
Love This Giant by David Byrne and St. Vincent (4AD)
Flux Remixed by Anomie Belle (Diving Bell)

Compilations featured
Afrobeat . . . NO GO DIE (2000, Shanachie Records)
Africafunk Vol. 2 (2000, Harmless Records)
Ouelele (2002 & 2006, Comet Records)
Red Hot & Riot (2002, MCA)
Afrobeat (2002, Blow Records)
Turntables on the Hudson Vol. 2 (2002, Musicrama)
African Xpress (2003, Narada Records)
Turntables on the Hudson Vol. 4 (2003, Caroline)
Rewind 3 (2003, Ubiquity Records)
“Badassss” Soundtrack (2004, Bbe Records)
Afrobeat Sessions (2004, Sessions)
Genocide in Sudan (2004, Reincarnate)
ASAP – Afrobeat Sudan Aid Project (2004, Modiba Productions)
Essential Afrobeat (2005, UMVD Import)
Impeach the Precedent (2005, Kicksnare Hat / Kajmere Sound)
Gilles Peterson in Africa (2005, Ether Records)
Let Rhythm Provide: An Emergency Compilation for Our Brothers and Sisters in New Orleans (2005, Ocote Soul Media)
Snowboy Presents the return of the Hi-Hat (2001, Ocho Records)
Daptone Gold (2009, Daptone Records)

Television appearances
Late Night with Jimmy Fallon NBC Television. August 24, 2012.

Films featured
Doin' It in the Park (2012, Bobbito Garcia and Kevin Couliau)

See also
Afrobeat
Fela Kuti
Funk Music

References

External links
Official Home Page

Musical groups from New York (state)
Musical groups from Brooklyn
Ninja Tune artists
Ropeadope Records artists
Afro-beat musical groups
American funk musical groups
Musical groups established in 1998
1998 establishments in New York City
Daptone Records artists
Anti- (record label) artists